Hirofumi (written: , , , , , , , , ,  or ) is a masculine Japanese given name. Notable people with the name include:

, Japanese actor
, Japanese actor and singer
, Japanese actor
, Japanese historian
, Japanese politician
, Japanese actor
, Japanese shogi player
, Japanese judoka
, Japanese golfer
, American-born Japanese footballer
, Japanese politician
, Japanese voice actor
, Japanese basketball player
, Japanese speed skater
, Japanese politician
, Japanese racewalker
, Japanese figure skater
, Japanese economist
, Japanese comedian
, Japanese garden designer and landscape architect
, Japanese footballer
, Japanese ichthyologist and environmentalist
, Japanese conductor
, Japanese politician

See also

Hirobumi is an older pronunciation of modern Hirofumi:

 Hirobumi Itō
 Hirobumi Watanabe

Japanese masculine given names